La Croisille-sur-Briance (literally La Croisille on Briance) is a commune in the Haute-Vienne department in the Nouvelle-Aquitaine region in western France.

Geography
The river Briance has its source in the commune.

See also
Communes of the Haute-Vienne department

References

Communes of Haute-Vienne